Paranomus is a genus of 18 species of flowering plants, commonly known as "sceptres", in the protea family. It is endemic to the Cape Floristic Region of South Africa.

Distribution and habitat
The species occur mainly in mountainous areas of the Western and Eastern Cape provinces from the Cederberg to Uitenhage, with the highest numbers found in the districts of Caledon, Worcester and Swellendam. They are often associated with fynbos habitats.

Etymology
The genus was named by English botanist Richard Anthony Salisbury from its unusual leaves, from the Greek para ("illegal" or "contrary"), and nomos ("custom" or "law"). It was subsequently renamed Nivenia by rival  botanist Robert Brown to honour plant collector James Niven, but Salisbury's name has priority. They are commonly known as “sceptres” or “sceptre plants” for the shape of their inflorescences and after the first of the genus to be described, P. sceptrum-gustavianus – “King Gustav's sceptre”, in 1777.

Description
Like the closely related serrurias they have divided leaves, though a distinctive feature of the genus is that individual plants of some species can bear both normal leaves and ones that are only minimally or even undivided. Other strange features of the leaves are that they do not have distinct upper and lower surfaces and their venation is primitive. The flowerheads are spike-like inflorescences in which the flowers are grouped into fours, with each group of four carried beneath a leathery bract. The shell-like bracts remain on the plant for a year or longer, well after the seeds have dropped off. The plants are not serotinous. They do not resprout after fires but regenerate from seeds which are shed soon after flowering.

Species
Described species include:

 Paranomus abrotanifolius Salisb. ex Knight – Bredasdorp sceptre
 Paranomus adiantifolius Salisb. ex Knight – Hairy-style sceptre
 Paranomus bolusii (Gand.) Levyns – Overberg or Viking sceptre
 Paranomus bracteolaris Salisb. ex Knight – Smooth-leaf tree sceptre
 Paranomus candicans Kuntze – Powder sceptre
 Paranomus capitatus Kuntze – Fine-leaf sceptre
 Paranomus centaureoides Levyns – Ladismith sceptre
 Paranomus dispersus Levyns – Long-head sceptre
 Paranomus dregei Kuntze – Scented sceptre
 Paranomus esterhuyseniae Levyns – Kouga sceptre
 Paranomus lagopus Salisb. – Rabbit-paw sceptre
 Paranomus longicaulis Salisb. ex Knight – Woolly sceptre or exploding baked apple
 Paranomus reflexus N.E. Br. – Van Staden's sceptre
 Paranomus roodebergensis (Compton) Levyns – Honey-scented sceptre
 Paranomus sceptrum-gustavianus Hyl. – King Gustav's sceptre
 Paranomus spathulatus Kuntze – Langeberg sceptre
 Paranomus spicatus Kuntze – Kogelberg sceptre
 Paranomus tomentosus N.E. Br. – Hairy-leaf sceptre

References

 
Proteaceae genera
Flora of the Cape Provinces